Barranca District is one of six districts of the province Datem del Marañón in Peru.

References

Districts of the Datem del Marañón Province
Districts of the Loreto Region
1886 establishments in Peru